Kingswear Daymark (also known as The Tower) is a 24 m (80 ft) octagonal limestone day beacon built in 1864, in an arable field above Froward Point  near the town of Kingswear, Devon, England.

Description
The daymark was constructed of local limestone and slate in an arable field. It is octagonal and sharply battered with a truncated open top, and has a tall narrow pointed head arch on each side, forming eight stilted pillars.

Construction
In 1863, Charles Seale Hayne, owner of Brownstone at that time, became a founder member of the Dartmouth Harbour Commission whose main aim was to improve access and facilities to Dartmouth harbour. The following year, Seale Hayne leased land for the erection of this tower as a day beacon.

See also
Day beacon
Landmark
Kingswear

References

Beacon towers
Daymarks
Towers completed in 1864